The 1967 National Football League draft was conducted March 14–15, 1967, at the Gotham Hotel in New York City. It was the first common draft with the AFL, part of the AFL–NFL merger agreement of June 1966.

This draft was delayed as new guidelines were established; redshirt (or "future") players were no longer eligible. It began on a Tuesday in mid-March; the previous two years the leagues held their separate drafts on the final Saturday of November, immediately following the college football regular season.

The expansion New Orleans Saints were initially awarded the first overall pick of the draft. The Saints traded the pick to the Baltimore Colts, who used it to select defensive end Bubba Smith.

Player selections

Round one

Round two

Round three

Round four

Round five

Round six

Round seven

Round eight

Round nine

Round ten

Round eleven

Round twelve

Round thirteen

Round fourteen

Round fifteen

Round sixteen

Round seventeen

Hall of Famers
 Ken Houston, defensive back from Prairie View A&M, taken 9th round 214th overall by AFL's Houston Oilers
Inducted: Professional Football Hall of Fame class of 1986.
 Willie Lanier, middle linebacker from Morgan State, taken 2nd round 50th overall by AFL's Kansas City Chiefs
Inducted: Professional Football Hall of Fame class of 1986.
 Gene Upshaw, offensive guard from Texas A&I, taken 1st round 17th overall by AFL's Oakland Raiders
Inducted: Professional Football Hall of Fame class of 1987.
 Alan Page, defensive end from Notre Dame, taken 1st round 15th overall by Minnesota Vikings, who converted him to defensive tackle
Inducted: Professional Football Hall of Fame class of 1988.
 Bob Griese, quarterback from Purdue, taken 1st round 4th overall by AFL's Miami Dolphins
Inducted: Professional Football Hall of Fame class of 1990.
 Jan Stenerud, placekicker from Montana State, undrafted and signed by AFL's Kansas City Chiefs
Inducted: Professional Football Hall of Fame class of 1991.
 Lem Barney, defensive back from Jackson State, taken 2nd round 34th overall by Detroit Lions
Inducted: Professional Football Hall of Fame class of 1992.
 Larry Little, offensive tackle from Bethune-Cookman, undrafted and signed by AFL's San Diego Chargers
Inducted: Professional Football Hall of Fame class of 1993.
 Rayfield Wright, offensive tackle from Fort Valley State, taken 7th round 182nd overall by Dallas Cowboys
Inducted: Professional Football Hall of Fame class of 2006.
 Floyd Little, running back from Syracuse University, taken 1st round 6th overall by Denver Broncos
Inducted: Professional Football Hall of Fame class of 2010.

Notable undrafted players

See also
 1967 NFL expansion draft

References

External links
 NFL.com – 1967 Draft 
 databaseFootball.com – 1967 Draft
 Pro Football Hall of Fame

National Football League Draft
Draft
Draft NFL
NFL Draft
American football in New York City
1960s in Manhattan
Sporting events in New York City
NFL Draft